Four-Forest Bilingual International School is a private day school located in Lucerne and Zug, Switzerland. Founded in 2007, it has around 280 pupils, whose ages range from 2 to 16.

Accreditation
Four Forest's kindergarten, primary school (Primarstufe 1.-6. Klasse, grade 1-6) and secondary school are approved by the bureau for elementary school (Amt für gemeindliche Schulen), administration for education (Bildungsdirektion), canton of Zug. as well as by the canton of Lucerne.

History
The bilingual international school was founded in 2007. In 2009 The Bee Hive Pre-school in Cham, Zug, was integrated. In 2016 the Swiss private school LMS-Schule Luzern became a member the FOUR-FOREST schools. Meanwhile, more than 280 students attend the campuses in Lucerne and Zug. The schools are located by the Rotsee in Lucerne and in the City of Zug.

Bilingual education
The immersion method, involving instruction by native-speakers, exposes students to the rational, emotional, and cultural dimensions of the second language. This is the foundation for developing complete fluency. :de:Bilingualismus
The instruction takes place in small groups. A preschool for children older than three, a forest-preschool, kindergarten and elementary school are offered. Instruction takes place in English and German, alternating weekly.
 
The school follows a curriculum which has been put together using the local Swiss curriculum and elements from the British National Curriculum. This curriculum begins in Pre-School with the 3-year old children and is followed by all children until 6th Grade. The children are taught equally in both English and German on a weekly basis (one week German, one week English). The school is accredited by the Canton Zug and the Canton Luzern.

The core subjects in the academic curriculum are: English, German, Maths, French, Science, History and Geography. Furthermore,  every child has the following lessons each week: Art, Design Technology, Drama, ICT, Music, PE and PHSE (Physical, Health and Social Education)

Primary & Secondary School
The Primary & Secondary School at Four-Forest is a full-time programme. The bilingual curriculum uses the local Swiss curriculum and elements from the British National Curriculum. The children are taught equally in both English and German on a weekly basis (one week German, one week English). All Grades are taught by two qualified and experienced mother-tongue teachers.

Kindergarten
Children start Kindergarten the August after the fifth birthday and are taught primarily by two teachers – one English mother-tongue and one German mother-tongue.

The children are taught on a weekly basis – one week English followed by one week German.
The curriculum has an emphasis on literacy and numeracy, and includes science, history, geography, ICT (Information and Communication Technology), P.E (Physical Education), dance, drama, music, art and craft.

Pre-School
The Pre-School gives young children their introduction to the learning environment from the age of three years. Early years activities include sand, water, modelling, arts and crafts, construction, books, games, puzzles and role-play. As the children develop, their skills in reading, language and numbers are fostered to provide a basis for literacy and numeracy.

Forest School
There are weekly visits to a woodland site. The philosophy of an outdoor classroom is to inspire children through participation in engaging and motivating achievable tasks and activities in a woodland environment, helping to develop personal, social and emotional skills.

Kinaesthetic learners [learning by doing] are particularly suited to learning in the woodland environment.

After school activities
Extra curricular activities:

 Private music classes
 Choir
 Drama
 Chess Club
 Art & Design
 Football
 Ballet classes
 Homework Club
 Chinese

Locations
The  Rotsee lake in Lucerne provides the setting for the Luzern campus. The Zug Campus is situated near the municipality of Steinhausen.

References

Wirtschaftsförderung Kanton Luzern
Wirtschaftsförderung Kanton Zug

External links

Official Four-Forest website
Official LMS-Schule website
Kanton Luzern
Schulen Luzern

Notes
Schon Dreijährige lernen Englisch, Neue Luzerner Zeitung
Primarschule in zwei Sprachen, Wirtschaftsförderung Luzern

Educational institutions established in 2007
International schools in Switzerland
Private schools in Switzerland
2007 establishments in Switzerland